Prelesje is a small settlement east of Dole in the Municipality of Litija in central Slovenia. The area is part of the traditional region of Lower Carniola. It is now included with the rest of the municipality in the Central Sava Statistical Region.

The local church is dedicated to Saint Lawrence and belongs to the Parish of Dole pri Litiji. It was built in the early 18th century.

References

External links
Prelesje on Geopedia

Populated places in the Municipality of Litija